The Sunnyside copper project is a copper exploration project located in Arizona's Patagonia Mountains in the southwestern United States.

The Sunnyside system consists of deep chalcopyrite mineralization in ~60 to 59 Ma quartz-feldspar porphyry, and near-surface, slightly younger (~59–58 Ma) enargite-chalcocite-tennantite mineralization in quartz-feldspar porphyry, quartz monzonite porphyry, and Mesozoic rocks. Base metal skarn mineralization has been intersected in deep drill holes on the property.

References 

Geography of Santa Cruz County, Arizona